Clash is a 2021 a Nigerian movie produced and directed by Pascal Atuma  under the American movie streaming company, Netflix. The movie advocates for multi-culturalism and it was co-founded by Telefilm Canada Media Fund (CMF) in order to support their mission for multi-culturalism.  The film stars cast across Nigeria and Canada such as Warren Beaty, Ola George, Omoni Oboli, Brian Hooks, Merlisa Langellier, Stephanie Linus, Vivian Williams, and Pascal Atuma

Synopsis 
The movie revolves a young man who had to live with a  lie that his uncle is his father. It later became a clash when he realised the truth on the day of his graduation.

Premiere 
The movie was supposed to be released on May 8, 2020 but due to COVID 19 it was not released until May 18, 2021 by Netflix.

Cast 

 Michelle Akanbi
 Percy Anane-Dwumfour
 Oscar Atuma
 Okorie Okereke
 Pascal Atuma
 Merlisa Determined
 Brian Dunstan
 Dashawn Francis
 Wendy German
 Deneisha Henry
 Brian Hooks
 Lou Israel
 Keith Kadette
 Tatiana King
 Stephanie Linus
 Omoni Oboli
 Daniel Olaluwoye
 Naima Sundiata
 Vivian Williams

References 

2021 films
Nigerian drama films
Canadian drama films
2020s Canadian films